Events from the year 1729 in Sweden

Incumbents
 Monarch - Frederick I

Events

 April - Sweden and Saxony finally resume peaceful connections with each other after the Great Nordic War.

Births
 31 January – Pehr Löfling, botanist (died 1756)
 1 May – Eric Gustaf Tunmarck, painter (died 1789).
 11 September – Jacob Johan Anckarström the Elder, nobleman (died 1777)
 21 October – Bengt Andersson Qvist, chemist and mineralogist (died 1799)

Deaths
 29 April –  Ingela Gathenhielm, privateer (born 1692)
 20 August  –  Gunnila Grubb, songwriter  (born 1692)
 22 October –  Anna Maria Ehrenstrahl, painter (born 1666)

References

 
Years of the 18th century in Sweden
Sweden